David Rolfe Graeber (February 12, 1961September 2, 2020) was an American anthropologist and anarchist activist. His influential work in economic anthropology, particularly his books Debt: The First 5,000 Years (2011), Bullshit Jobs (2018), and The Dawn of Everything (2021), and his leading role in the Occupy movement, earned him recognition as one of the foremost anthropologists and left-wing thinkers of his time.

Born in New York to a working-class Jewish family, Graeber studied at Purchase College and the University of Chicago, where he conducted ethnographic research in Madagascar under Marshall Sahlins and obtained his doctorate in 1996. He was an assistant professor at Yale University from 1998 to 2005, when the university controversially decided not to renew his contract before he was eligible for tenure. Unable to secure another position in the United States, he entered an "academic exile" in England, where he was a lecturer and reader at Goldsmiths' College from 2008 to 2013, and a professor at the London School of Economics from 2013.

In his early scholarship, Graeber specialized in theories of value (Toward an Anthropological Theory of Value, 2002), social hierarchy and political power (Fragments of an Anarchist Anthropology, 2004, Possibilities, 2007, On Kings, 2017), and the ethnography of Madagascar (Lost People, 2007). In the 2010s he turned to historical anthropology, producing his best-known book, Debt: The First 5000 Years (2011), an exploration of the historical relationship between debt and social institutions, as well as a series of essays on the origins of social inequality in prehistory. In parallel, he developed critiques of bureaucracy and managerialism in contemporary capitalism, published in The Utopia of Rules (2015) and Bullshit Jobs (2018). He coined the concept of bullshit jobs in a 2013 essay that explored the proliferation of "paid employment that is so completely pointless, unnecessary, or pernicious that even the employee cannot justify its existence".

Although exposed to radical left politics from a young age, Graeber's direct involvement in activism began with the global justice movement of the 1990s. He attended protests against the 3rd Summit of the Americas in Quebec City in 2001 and the World Economic Forum in New York in 2002, and later wrote an ethnography of the movement, Direct Action (2009). In 2011, he became well known as one of the leading figures of Occupy Wall Street and is credited with coining the slogan "We are the 99%". His later activism included interventions in support of the Rojava revolution in Syria, the British Labour Party under Jeremy Corbyn and Extinction Rebellion.

David Graeber died unexpectedly in September 2020, while on vacation in Venice. His last book, The Dawn of Everything: A New History of Humanity, co-written with archaeologist David Wengrow, was published posthumously in 2021.

Early life and education 
Graeber's parents, who were in their forties when Graeber was born, were self-taught working-class Jewish intellectuals in New York. Graeber's mother, Ruth Rubinstein, had been a garment worker, and played the lead role in the 1930s musical comedy revue Pins & Needles, staged by the International Ladies' Garment Workers' Union. Graeber's father, Kenneth, was affiliated with the Young Communist League in college, participated in the Spanish Revolution in Barcelona and fought in the Spanish Civil War. He later worked as a plate stripper on offset presses. Graeber grew up in Penn South, a union-sponsored housing cooperative in Chelsea, Manhattan, described by Business Week magazine as "suffused with radical politics."

Graeber had his first experience of political activism at the age of seven, when he attended peace marches in New York's Central Park and Fire Island. He was an anarchist from the age of 16, according to an interview he gave to The Village Voice in 2005.

Graeber graduated from Phillips Academy Andover in 1978 and received his B.A. from the State University of New York at Purchase in 1984. He received his master's degree and doctorate at the University of Chicago, where he won a Fulbright fellowship to conduct 20 months of ethnographic field research in Betafo, Madagascar, beginning in 1989. His resulting Ph.D. thesis on magic, slavery, and politics was supervised by Marshall Sahlins and entitled The Disastrous Ordeal of 1987: Memory and Violence in Rural Madagascar.

Academic career

Yale University (1998–2005) 
In 1998, two years after completing his PhD, Graeber became assistant professor at Yale University, then associate professor. In May 2005, the Yale anthropology department decided not to renew Graeber's contract, preventing consideration for academic tenure, which was scheduled for 2008. Pointing to Graeber's anthropological scholarship, his supporters (including fellow anthropologists, former students and activists) said the decision was politically motivated. More than 4,500 people signed petitions supporting him, and anthropologists such as Marshall Sahlins, Laura Nader, Michael Taussig, and Maurice Bloch called on Yale to reverse its decision. Bloch, who had been a professor of anthropology at the London School of Economics and the Collège de France, and a writer on Madagascar, praised Graeber in a letter to the university.

The Yale administration argued that Graeber's dismissal was in keeping with Yale's policy of granting tenure to few junior faculty. Graeber suggested that Yale's decision might have been influenced by his support of a student of his who was targeted for expulsion because of her membership in GESO, Yale's graduate student union.

In December 2005, Graeber agreed to leave Yale after a one-year paid sabbatical. That spring he taught two final classes: "Introduction to Cultural Anthropology" (attended by more than 200 students) and a seminar, "Direct Action and Radical Social Theory".

"Academic exile" and London (2005–2020) 
On May 25, 2006, Graeber was invited to give the Malinowski Lecture at the London School of Economics. Each year, the LSE anthropology department asks an anthropologist at a relatively early stage of their career to give the Malinowski Lecture, and only invites those considered to have made significant contributions to anthropological theory. Graeber's address was called "Beyond Power/Knowledge: an exploration of the relation of power, ignorance and stupidity". It was later edited into an essay, "Dead zones of the imagination: On violence, bureaucracy and interpretive labor". The same year, Graeber was asked to present the keynote address in the 100th anniversary Diamond Jubilee meetings of the Association of Social Anthropologists. In April 2011, he presented the anthropology department's annual Distinguished Lecture at Berkeley, and in May 2012 delivered the second annual Marilyn Strathern Lecture at Cambridge (the first was delivered by Strathern).

After his dismissal from Yale, Graeber was unable to secure another position at an American university. He applied for more than twenty, but despite a strong track record and letters of recommendation from several prominent anthropologists, never made it past the first round. At the same time, a number of foreign universities approached him with offers. In an article on his "academic exile" from the United States, The Chronicle of Higher Education interviewed several anthropology professors who agreed that Graeber's political activism could have played a role in his unsuccessful search, describing the field as "radical in the abstract" (in the words of Laura Nader) but intolerant of direct political action. Another factor suggested by the article was that Graeber had acquired a reputation as being personally difficult or "uncollegial", especially in light of allegations of poor conduct made by Yale during the dispute over his dismissal. Graeber himself interpreted his exclusion from American academia as a direct result of his dismissal from Yale, likening it to "black-balling in a social club", and arguing that the charge of "uncollegiality" glossed a variety of other personal qualities, from his political activism to his working-class background, that marked him as a trouble-maker within the academic hierarchy. Laura Nader, reflecting on Graeber's case amongst other examples of "academic silencing" in anthropology, speculated that the real reasons could have included Graeber's growing reputation as a public intellectual, and his tendency to "write in English" rather than jargon.

From 2008 to 2013, Graeber was a lecturer and a reader at Goldsmiths College of the University of London. In 2013, he accepted a professorship at the London School of Economics.

Graeber was a founding member of the Institute for Experimental Arts in Greece. He gave a lecture with the title "How social and economic structure influences the Art World" in the International MultiMedia Poetry Festival organized by the Institute for Experimental Arts supported by the Department of Anthropology of the London School of Economics and Political Science.

Scholarship 
Graeber is the author of Fragments of an Anarchist Anthropology and Toward an Anthropological Theory of Value: The False Coin of Our Own Dreams. He conducted extensive anthropological work in Madagascar, writing his doctoral thesis, The Disastrous Ordeal of 1987: Memory and Violence in Rural Madagascar, on the continuing social division between the descendants of nobles and the descendants of former slaves. A book based on his dissertation, Lost People: Magic and the Legacy of Slavery in Madagascar, was published by Indiana University Press in September 2007. A book of collected essays, Possibilities: Essays on Hierarchy, Rebellion, and Desire was published by AK Press in November 2007, and Direct Action: An Ethnography appeared from the same press in August 2009. Moreover, the aforementioned publisher printed a collection of essays by Graeber – co-edited with Stevphen Shukaitis and Erika Biddle – called Constituent Imagination: Militant Investigations/Collective Theorization (AK Press, May 2007).

In December 2017, Graeber and his former teacher Marshall Sahlins released a collection of essays entitled On Kings, outlining a theory, inspired by A. M. Hocart, of the origins of human sovereignty in cosmological ritual. Graeber contributed essays on the Shilluk and Merina kingdoms, and a final essay that explored what he called "the constitutive war between king and people". He was working on a historical work on the origins of social inequality with David Wengrow, published posthumously as The Dawn of Everything.

From January 2013 until June 2016, Graeber was a contributing editor at The Baffler magazine in Cambridge, Massachusetts, where he, too, participated in the public debate about futures of technology. From 2011 until 2017 he was editor-at-large of the open access journal HAU: Journal of Ethnographic Theory, for which he and Giovanni da Col co-wrote the founding theoretical statement and manifesto of the school of "ethnographic theory".

Charles Kenny, writing in the political magazine Democracy, claimed that Graeber sought out data that "fit the narrative on the evils of neoliberalism" and challenged or criticised data which suggested otherwise.

Debt: The First 5000 Years 

Graeber's first major historical monograph was Debt: The First 5000 Years (2011).

Karl Schmid, writing in the Canadian Anthropology Society's journal Anthropologica, described Debt as an "unusual book" which "may be the most read public anthropology book of the 21st century" and noted that "it will be difficult for Graeber or anyone else to top this book for the attention it received due to excellent timing". Schmid compared Debt to Jared Diamond's Guns, Germs, and Steel and James C. Scott's The Art of Not Being Governed for its "vast scope and implication". However, Schmid expressed minor frustrations with the sheer length of the book, and the fact that Graeber raises many claims and examples which he does not go on to develop in full.

J. Bradford DeLong, an economic historian, criticised Debt on his blog, alleging mistakes in the book. Graeber responded that these errors had no influence on his argument, remarking that the "biggest actual mistake DeLong managed to detect in the 544 pages of Debt, despite years of flailing away, was (iirc) that I got the number of Presidential appointees on the Federal Open Market Committee board wrong". He dismissed his other criticisms as representing a divergence of interpretation, truncation of his arguments by DeLong, and mistakes in the copy editing of the book.

Bureaucracy, managerialism, and "bullshit jobs" 

Much of Graeber's later scholarship focused on the topic of "bullshit jobs", proliferated by administrative bloat and what Graeber calls "managerial feudalism". One of the points he raised in his 2013 book The Democracy Project—on the Occupy movement—is the increase in what he calls bullshit jobs, referring to forms of employment that even those holding the jobs feel should not or do not need to exist. He sees such jobs as being typically "concentrated in professional, managerial, clerical, sales, and service workers". As he explained also in an article in STRIKE!: "Huge swathes of people, in Europe and North America in particular, spend their entire working lives performing tasks they secretly believe do not really need to be performed".

Because of the article's popularity, Graeber then wrote the book Bullshit Jobs: A theory, published in 2018 by Simon & Schuster. Writing for The New Yorker, Nathan Heller described the resulting book as having "the virtue of being both clever and charismatic". Reviewing the book for The New York Times, Alana Semuels noted that although it could be criticised for generalisations about economics "Graeber’s anthropological eye and skepticism about capitalism are useful in questioning some parts of the economy that the West has come to accept as normal." The Guardian gave a mixed review of Graeber's Bullshit Jobs, accusing him of having a "slightly condescending attitude" and attesting to the book's "laboured arguments", while referring to aspects of the book's thesis as "clearly right". Bullshit Jobs spent four weeks in the top-20 of the Los Angeles Times''' bestseller list. The book was awarded "Book of the Year 2018" by each of the Financial Times, New Statesman, and City AM.

 Activism 

In addition to his academic work, Graeber was directly and indirectly involved in political activism. He was a member of the labor union Industrial Workers of the World, protested at the World Economic Forum in New York City in 2002, supported the 2010 UK student protests, and played an early role in the Occupy Wall Street movement. He was co-founder of the Anti-Capitalist Convergence.

Graeber became a strong advocate of the democratic confederalism of the Autonomous Administration of North and East Syria after visiting the region in 2014, often drawing parallels between it and the Spanish Revolution his father fought for in the 1930s.

On October 11, 2019, Graeber spoke at an Extinction Rebellion protest in Trafalgar Square about the relationship between "bullshit jobs" and environmental harm, suggesting that the environmental movement should recognize these jobs in combination with unnecessary construction or infrastructure projects and planned obsolescence as significant issues.

 Occupy movement 

In November 2011, Rolling Stone credited Graeber with giving the Occupy Wall Street movement its theme: "We are the 99 percent". Graeber wrote in The Democracy Project that the slogan "was a collective creation". Rolling Stone said he helped create the first New York City General Assembly, with only 60 participants, on August 2. He spent the next six weeks involved with the burgeoning movement, including facilitating general assemblies, attending working group meetings, and organizing legal and medical training and classes on nonviolent resistance. A few days after the encampment of Zuccotti Park began, he left New York for Austin, Texas.

Graeber argued that the Occupy Wall Street movement's lack of recognition of the legitimacy of either existing political institutions or the legal structure, its embrace of non-hierarchical consensus decision-making and of prefigurative politics made it a fundamentally anarchist project. Comparing it to the Arab Spring, he claimed that Occupy Wall Street and other contemporary grassroots protests represented "the opening salvo in a wave of negotiations over the dissolution of the American Empire." Writing in Al Jazeera, he noted that from the beginning the Occupy movement was about a "commitment to answer only to a moral order, not a legal one" and so held meetings without the requisite permits. Defending this early decision of the Occupy movement, he said, "as the public, we should not need permission to occupy public space".

Graeber tweeted in 2014 that he had been evicted from his family's home of over 50 years due to his involvement with Occupy Wall Street. He added that others associated with Occupy had received similar "administrative harassment".

 British politics 
In November 2019, along with other public figures, Graeber signed a letter supporting Labour Party leader Jeremy Corbyn, calling him "a beacon of hope in the struggle against emergent far-right nationalism, xenophobia and racism in much of the democratic world" and endorsed him in the 2019 UK general election. In December 2019, along with 42 other leading cultural figures, he signed a letter endorsing the Labour Party under Corbyn's leadership in the 2019 general election. The letter stated that "Labour's election manifesto under Jeremy Corbyn's leadership offers a transformative plan that prioritises the needs of people and the planet over private profit and the vested interests of a few." Graeber, who was Jewish, also defended Corbyn from accusations of antisemitism, saying that "What actually threatens Jews, the people who actually want to kill us, are Nazis", and that the allegations represented a "weaponization" of antisemitism for political purposes.Stuart Jeffries (March 21, 2015), "David Graeber interview: ‘So many people spend their working lives doing jobs they think are unnecessary’" , The Guardian. Retrieved April 12, 2019.

Graeber advocated for a boycott of The Guardian newspaper by fellow left-wing authors after alleging that the paper published distortions against Corbyn for years. He denounced what he claimed was the weaponisation of antisemitism for political purposes, and The Guardians alleged role in undermining Corbyn in the 2019 election, which, according to Graeber, resulted in a landslide victory for Boris Johnson. He asserted that The Guardian only publishes progressive authors in order to gain credibility with its readership, but its editorial policy is at odds with socialist politics. He was a vocal critic of the Labour centrists who attacked Corbyn, stating their disdain for socialist movements was due to their previously selling-out: "If those activists were not naive, if this man was not unelectable, the centrists’ entire lives had been a lie. They hadn’t really accepted reality at all. They really were just sellouts."

 Influence and reception 
Kate Burrell wrote, in the journal Sociology, that Graeber's work "promotes anarchist visions of social change, which are not quite believed possible by the Left, yet are lived out within social movements every day" and that his work "offers poetic insight into the daily realities of life as an activist, overtly promotes anarchism, and is a hopeful celebration of just what can be achieved by relatively small groups of committed individuals living their truth visibly."

Hans Steinmüller, reviewing On Kings in the Journal of the Royal Anthropological Institute, described Graeber and his co-author Marshall Sahlins as "two of the most important anthropological thinkers of our time" and considered their contribution to represent a "benchmark" for the anthropological theory of kingship.

As stated by Penguin Random House editor Tom Penn, “David was a true radical, a pioneer in everything that he did. David's inspirational work has changed and shaped the way people understand the world... In his books, his constant, questing curiosity, his wry, sharp-eyed provoking of received nostrums shine through. So too, above all, does his unique ability to imagine a better world, borne out of his own deep and abiding humanity. We are deeply honoured to be his publisher, and we will all miss him: his kindness, his warmth, his wisdom, his friendship. His loss is incalculable, but his legacy is immense. His work and his spirit will live on.”

Personal life
After a relationship with anthropologist Lauren Leve, Graeber married artist Nika Dubrovsky in 2019. The two collaborated on a series of books, workshops, and conversations called Anthropology for Kids'' and on the Museum of Care, a shared space for communication and social interactions nourishing values of solidarity, care, and reciprocity. According to David Graeber website, “The main goal of the Museum of Care is to produce and maintain social relationships.”  The concept “museum of care” was coined by Graeber and Dubrovsky in their article “The Museum of Care: imagining the world after the pandemic”, originally published in “Arts Of The Working Class” in April 2020.  In the article, Graeber and Dubrovsky imagine a post-pandemic future, where vast surfaces of office spaces and conservative institutions are turned into “free city universities, social centers and hotels for those in need of shelter”. “We could call them ‘Museums of Care' - precisely because they are spaces that do not celebrate production of any sort but rather provide the space and means for the creation of social relationships and the imagining of entirely new forms of social relations.”

Death
Graeber died suddenly from necrotic pancreatitis on September 2, 2020 while on vacation with his wife and friends in Venice. Graeber died during the COVID-19 pandemic and instead of a funeral, his family organized an "Intergalactic Memorial Carnival" of livestreamed events that took place in October 2020. His wife, Dubrovsky, attributed the pancreatitis to COVID-19, saying they both had strange symptoms for months beforehand, and she said there was a connection between COVID-19 and pancreatitis.

Selected publications

References

Further reading

External links 

 
 
 
 
 

1961 births
2020 deaths
Academics of Goldsmiths, University of London
Academics of the London School of Economics
Activists from New York City
American anarchists
American anthropologists
American anti-capitalists
American expatriates in the United Kingdom
American male non-fiction writers
American political writers
Anarchist economics
Anarchist theorists
Anti-corporate activists
Economic anthropologists
Historians of anarchism
Industrial Workers of the World members
Jewish anarchists
Jewish philosophers
Jewish American writers
Phillips Academy alumni
State University of New York at Purchase alumni
University of Chicago alumni
World historians
Writers from New York City
Yale University faculty
Critics of work and the work ethic
Fulbright alumni